Bedirli can refer to:

 Bədirli, Azerbaijan
 Bedirli, Yeşilova, Turkey